Hans Leibelt (11 March 1885 in Leipzig, German Empire – 3 December 1974 in Munich, West Germany) was a German film actor.

Selected filmography

 Heimliche Sünder (1926)
 The False Prince (1927)
 The Man in Search of His Murderer (1931) as Adamowski
 The Street Song (1931) as the inspector
 The Captain from Köpenick (1931) as Man at the advertising column
 You Don't Forget Such a Girl (1932) as Hahnen Sr.
 Night Convoy (1932)
 The Magic Top Hat (1932) as the stage director
 Love at First Sight (1932) as Count Prillwitz
 Contest (1932) as Brandt, Mercedes team manager
 Morgenrot (1933) as Bürgermeister von Meerskirchen
 Konjunkturritter (1934)
 Zimmermädchen... Dreimal klingeln (1934) as Otto Ruhland
 The Girlfriend of a Big Man (1934) as Reider the banker
 My Heart Calls You (1934)
 A Man Wants to Get to Germany (1934) as Morron, Manuela's advisor
 The Island (1934) as Bank Director
 Heinz in the Moon (1934) as Professor Ass
 The Old and the Young King (1935) as Knobelsdorf
 Die törichte Jungfrau (1935) as Herr Leibel
 The Blonde Carmen (1935) as Max Kruse
 Die Werft zum Grauen Hecht (1935) as Werftbesitzer Liebenow
 Stradivari (1935) as Professor Hoefer
 The Royal Waltz (1935) as Minister Doenniges
The Green Domino (1935) as Justizrat Lorenz
 The Higher Command (1935) as Mayor Stappenbeck
 Savoy Hotel 217 (1936) as Untersuchungsrichter
 Inkognito (1936) as Severins Diener Hannibald Williges
 Männer vor der Ehe (1936) as Heinrich Rothe - Fabriksbesitzer
 A Wedding Dream (1936) as Graf Morotschin
 A Woman of No Importance (1936) as Lord Illingworth Senior
 Dahinten in der Heide (1936) as Commissioner Freimut 
 Thunder, Lightning and Sunshine (1936) as Jacob Greizinger
 The Night With the Emperor (1936) as Bürgermeister von Erfurt
 Under Blazing Heavens (1936) as Police Inspector
 Kinderarzt Dr. Engel (1936) as Tierarzt Dr. Baumbusch
 Wie der Hase läuft (1937) as Pastor Piepenbrink
 Capers (1937) as Neville
 The Citadel of Warsaw (1937) as General Horn
 Signal in the Night (1937) as Schneblinger - Bursche von Auersberg
 Gewitterflug zu Claudia (1937) as Inspector Baeuerle
 My Friend Barbara (1937) as Andermann Senior
 Rätsel um Beate (1938) as August Deinhard
 Between the Parents (1938) as Dr. Feldern, Rechtsanwalt
 The Secret Lie (1938) as Sam Milbrey
 The Girl of Last Night (1938) as Mr. Barrow
 Grossalarm (1938)
 The Great and the Little Love (1938)
 Mordsache Holm (1938) as Kriminalkommissar Engel
 Was tun, Sybille? (1938) as Professor Fromann
 Eine Frau kommt in die Tropen (1938) as Konsul Carsten
 Schwarzfahrt ins Glück (1938)
 The Deruga Case (1938) as Dr. Klemm
 Dance on the Volcano (1938) as Prince Louis Philippe
 The False Step (1939) as Minister Wullesdorf
 The Green Emperor (1939) as Picard
 Woman Without a Past (1939) as Consul Willmann
 Fräulein (1939) as Hermann Schilling
 A Woman Like You (1939) as Watchman
 Der Stammbaum des Dr. Pistorius (1939) as Dr.
 Lauter Liebe (1940) as Herr Haeberling
 Casanova heiratet (1940) as Hans Brinkmann
 The Girl at the Reception (1940) as Karl Hartmann
 The Rothschilds (1940) as King Louis XVIII
 The Girl from Barnhelm (1940) as Count Bruchsall
 Friedrich Schiller – The Triumph of a Genius (1940) as Professor Abel
 Kora Terry (1940) as Bartos
 Herzensfreud - Herzensleid (1940) as Konsul Verhagen
 Der Kleinstadtpoet (1940) as Von Lindau, Landrat
 Das himmelblaue Abendkleid (1941) as Kurt Haberland
 Carl Peters (1941) as Prof. Karl Engel
 Happiness is the Main Thing (1941) as Director Ardnt
 The Swedish Nightingale (1941) as Theatre Director
 The Gasman (1941) as the famous defense attorney
 Immer nur Du (1941) as Polizeikommissar
 Ich klage an (1941)
 Women Are Better Diplomats (1941) as Counsellor Berger
 Tanz mit dem Kaiser (1941) as Baron Teuffenbach
 Much Ado About Nixi (1942) as Barkas
 The Thing About Styx (1942) as Consul Sander
 Meine Freundin Josefine (1942) as Herr Bauer
 Ein Walzer mit dir (1943) as Direktor Wolter, vom neuen Operetten-Theater
 A Salzburg Comedy (1943) as Mr. Dirksen
 Die Wirtin zum Weißen Röß'l (1943) as Direktor Hartmann
 Titanic (1943) (uncredited)
 I'll Carry You in My Arms (1943) as Hans Wiegand
 Reise in die Vergangenheit (1943) as Dr.Werner Birkner
 Die Feuerzangenbowle (1944) as Principal Knauer
 Die Zaubergeige (1944) as Prof. Becker
 The Roedern Affair (1944) as the high marshall
 Ein fröhliches Haus (1944) as Onkel Paul Hagedorn
 Peter Voss, Thief of Millions (1946) as Van Gelder
 Somewhere in Berlin (1946) as Herr Eckmann
 Raid (1947) as Hugo Lembke
 Marriage in the Shadows (1947) as Fehrenbach
 1-2-3 Corona (1948) as Circus Manager Barlay
 An Everyday Story (1948) as Annelieses's father
 The Court Concert (1948) as Marshall von Arneck
 Artists' Blood (1949) as Schröder
 Ich mach dich glücklich (1949) as Herr Meinert
 Dangerous Guests (1949) as Director Schleinitz
 Beloved Liar (1950) as Director Berger
 Five Suspects (1950) as Dr. Lassens
 Blondes for Export (1950) as Intendant Hallerstedt
 My Niece Susanne (1950) as Gratin
 Mathilde Möhring (1950)
 The Lie (1950) as Martin Altenberger
 The Man in Search of Himself (1950) as Mr. Miller
 The Orplid Mystery (1950) as Cheflektor Kurt Beckmann
 Kissing Is No Sin (1950)
 Not Without Gisela (1951) as Werner the banker
 Miracles Still Happen (1951) as Prof. Nibius
 A Heidelberg Romance (1951) as William Edwards
 That Can Happen to Anyone (1952) as Buttermann
 House of Life (1952) as Kögl the portier
 Fritz and Friederike (1952) as President Meinhard
 Marriage for One Night (1953) as Hans Hoppe
 Heute nacht passiert's (1953) as Professor Meerwald
 They Call It Love (1953) as Carlos Schmidt
 The Postponed Wedding Night (1953) as Emil Dobermann
 The Divorcée (1953) as Pastor
 Under the Stars of Capri (1953) as Capitain Hagedorn
 The Charming Young Lady (1953) as Braun the chocolatier
 Dein Mund verspricht mir Liebe (1954) as Kommerzienrat Röder
 Bruder Martin (1954) as General
 Sonne über der Adria (1954)
 A Girl from Paris (1954)
 The Great Test (1954) as Direktor
 The Spanish Fly (1955) as Breilmann
 Let the Sun Shine Again (1955) as Dr. Retlinger
 Du mein stilles Tal (1955) as Pfarrer
 The Royal Waltz (1955) as Minister Wilhelm von Dönniges
 Lost Child 312 (1955) as Rechtsanwalt
 The Mistress of Solderhof (1955) as Professor Hilgen
 Charley's Aunt (1956) as Niels Bergström
 San Salvatore (1956) as Professor Weber
 Mädchen mit schwachem Gedächtnis (1956) as Mr. Turner
 Black Forest Melody (1956) as Mr. Morton
 Melody of the Heath (1956) as Moralt
 Little Man on Top (1957) as Petersen
 Marriages Forbidden (1957) as Franz Bruckner
 Der Bauerndoktor von Bayrischzell (1957) as Oberamtsarzt
 The Mad Bomberg (1957) as Professor von Wetzelstien
 Vater sein dagegen sehr (1957) as Minister Miesbach
 Es wird alles wieder gut (1957) as Regierungsrat Milbe
 Spring in Berlin (1957) as Barna
 Greetings and Kisses from Tegernsee (1957) as Mr. Hoover
 The Crammer (1958) as Headmaster Wiesbacher
 Peter Voss, Thief of Millions (1958) as Mr. Rottmann
 Wir Wunderkinder (1958) as Mr. Lüttenjense
 The Domestic Tyrant (1959) as the judge
 The Man Who Sold Himself (1959) as the burgomaster
 Liebe auf krummen Beinen (1959) as Sekretär
 Every Day Isn't Sunday (1959) as Dr. Börger
 Labyrinth (1959) as Padre Jeannot
 The Man Who Walked Through the Wall (1959) as Holtzheimer
 The Buddenbrooks (1959, part 1, 2) as Dr. Friedrich Grabow
 A Glass of Water (1960) as Thompson, Butler
 My Schoolfriend (1960) as Professor Strohbach
 The True Jacob (1960) as Eduard Struwe
 Die Botschafterin (1960) as Staatspräsident
 The Black Sheep (1960) as Bank Director James Conelly
 Im sechsten Stock (1961)
 Max the Pickpocket (1962)
 Das schwarz-weiß-rote Himmelbett (1962) as Pfarrer
 Der 42. Himmel (1962) as Gerichtspräsident
 Das Liebeskarussell (1965)
 Once a Greek (1966) (final film role)

Bibliography
 Hardt, Usula. From Caligari to California: Erich Pommer's Life in the International Film Wars. Berghahn Books, 1996.
 Shandley, Robert R. Rubble Films: German Cinema in the Shadow of the Third Reich. Temple University Press, 2001.

External links

1885 births
1974 deaths
German male film actors
German male silent film actors
Actors from Leipzig
Burials at the Ostfriedhof (Munich)
20th-century German male actors